Darkness Falls is a 2003 supernatural horror film written by Joe Harris, James Vanderbilt and John Fasano, and directed by Jonathan Liebesman, in his feature directorial debut. The film stars Chaney Kley and Emma Caulfield, and follows Kyle Walsh (Kley), who witnesses his mother's murder at the hands of a vengeful spirit lynched by an angry mob more than 150 years ago. Twelve years later, Kyle returns to his childhood home because Michael Greene (Lee Cormie), the young brother of his romantic interest Caitlin (Caulfield), is being stalked by the same spirit. Kyle must protect them from this powerful enemy and put an end to its killing spree. Released on January 24, 2003, it was critically panned.

Plot

In the middle of the 19th century, in the town of Darkness Falls, elderly widow Matilda Dixon was adored by the town's children. She would give them a gold coin whenever they lost a tooth, earning her the nickname Tooth Fairy. One night, a fire broke out in her house and left her face disfigured and severely sensitive to light. She wore a white porcelain mask and would only leave her house at night. However, the town's adults were suspicious of Matilda, believing her to be a witch. When two children went missing, the town quickly turned on Matilda. They exposed her face to light and hanged her. Before her death, Matilda placed a curse on the town and swore revenge. When the two missing children returned home unharmed, the town realized their mistake and quickly buried Matilda's body, keeping their deed a secret. Over the next 150 years, the story of Matilda became the legend of the Tooth Fairy; her spirit visits children on the night they lose their last tooth. If anyone lays eyes upon her, they will forever be marked for her vengeance.

In 1990, Kyle Walsh, an antisocial teenager befriended by Caitlin Greene, loses his last baby tooth. That night, he wakes after a horrific nightmare and senses Matilda's presence, discovering that the story is true. Knowing she cannot bear the light, he shines a flashlight into her face and flees, hiding in the brightly lit bathroom. His mother tries to reassure him that there is nobody else in the house, but is killed after seeing Matilda in Kyle's room. The next morning, police arrive and Kyle is removed to a psychiatric institution after mistaken speculations that he killed his mother.

Twelve years later, Caitlin telephones Kyle to ask for his help with her younger brother Michael, who refuses to sleep in the dark. Kyle still suffers extreme paranoia from his encounter with Matilda; he has dozens of flashlights and numerous medications for anxiety, depression and sleep disorders. Kyle visits Michael at the hospital but denies any relation to his condition and walks away from Caitlin, who still believes that the legend of Matilda Dixon is just a story, one which they were all told as children, but a story nonetheless.

Kyle tries to warn others of Matilda but faces ridicule and skepticism, which leads to the death of many townspeople. A lightning storm blacks out the whole town, and realizing that Michael and Caitlin are in danger, Kyle rushes to the hospital. He rescues them and gains allies along the way, as others see Matilda and realize the story is true. Kyle, Michael and Caitlin flee and hide in the lighthouse. They are helped by several medical personnel, all of whom are killed by Matilda.

During his final confrontation with Matilda, power is restored and the lighthouse beacon is activated. The sudden exposure to light causes Matilda excruciating pain, and Kyle tears off her mask. Seeing her grotesque, disfigured face, he realizes she is now vulnerable. Enraged, she resumes her attack. Kyle sets his right sleeve on fire and he strikes her face with it. As her spirit is engulfed in flame, Matilda is destroyed and her curse is finally brought to an end.

In a final scene, a young boy is being tucked into bed by his parents, having just lost his last baby tooth. As he sleeps, his mother replaces the tooth under his pillow with a gold coin, indicating that Matilda is gone and her curse is lifted.

Cast

 Chaney Kley as Kyle Walsh
 Joshua Anderson as Young Kyle Walsh
 Jacob Worrall as Body double for Young Kyle Walsh
 Emma Caulfield as Caitlin Greene
 Emily Browning as Young Caitlin Greene
 Lee Cormie as Michael Greene
 Grant Piro as Larry Fleishman
 John Stanton as Captain Thomas Henry
 Sullivan Stapleton as Officer Matt Henry
 Steve Mouzakis as Dr. Peter Murphy
 Peter Curtin as Dr. Travis
 Kestie Morassi as Nurse Lauren
 Jenny Lovell as Nurse Alexandra
 Antony Burrows as Matilda Dixon 
Gary A. Hecker voices Matilda Dixon's vocal effects
 Korie Ferguson as Mrs. Watkins
 Rebecca McCauley as Margaret Walsh
 Angus Sampson as Ray "The Drinking Buddy"

Soundtrack

The film's closing credits feature the song "Gunboat" by Vixtrola. Other songs featured in the film include "Look Out Below" by Closure, "Hand of Emptiness" by Brian Tichy, and "Rock Nation" by Scott Nickoley and Jamie Dunlap.

Reception

Box office
Darkness Falls debuted at number one its opening weekend. Grossing $32,551,396 domestically and $47,488,536 worldwide, Darkness Falls was considered a commercial success at the U.S. box office, recouping its $11 million budget.

Critical response 
According to review aggregate website Rotten Tomatoes, 9% of critics out of 131 reviews gave the film a positive review, with an average rating of 3.2/10; the critical consensus is: "A derivative movie where the scares are few and things don't make much sense". On Metacritic, the film has a score of 23 out of 100, indicating "generally unfavorable reviews", based on reviews from 27 critics. Audiences polled by CinemaScore gave the film an average grade of "B−" on an A+ to F scale.

In his review for The New York Times, Stephen Holden called the film "an efficient little horror movie that doesn't waste its time getting down to business." Although the film had a "deliberate sparseness of gore," Holden noted the "demonization of a benign childhood phantom" as the film's "cleverest notion." Jamie Russell of the BBC gave it 3/5 stars, writing: "This is a self-consciously silly, completely disposable multiplex movie that does its best to deliver its fair share of chills while struggling to keep a straight face."

Kevin Thomas of the Los Angeles Times said that although "the filmmakers and their cast strive mightily to work up some thrills and chills," the film ultimately was "not all that scary." Philip French of The Observer called it "a mish mash of horror-movie clichés". Alexander Walker of the Evening Standard wrote: "Bogey-fanciers may enjoy it; others may want to check out long before they all take refuge in the lighthouse."

Novelization
Joe Harris wrote Darkness Falls: The Tragic Life of Matilda Dixon, a prequel comic, which was published by Dark Horse Comics. Keith R. A. DeCandido wrote a novelization of the film, which was published by Pocket Books in December 2002.

See also
 List of ghost films
 Tooth fairy
 Night terror
 They, a 2002 horror film with a similar premise to this film.

References

External links

2003 films
2003 horror films
2000s ghost films
American ghost films
American supernatural horror films
Australian horror films
Australian supernatural films
Columbia Pictures films
Films scored by Brian Tyler
Films about fear
Australian films about revenge
American films about revenge
Films about curses
Films about sleep disorders
Films directed by Jonathan Liebesman
Films shot in Melbourne
Revolution Studios films
Films with screenplays by James Vanderbilt
Films with screenplays by John Fasano
2003 directorial debut films
2000s English-language films
2000s American films